Francistown Senior Secondary School  is a government Institution located in Francistown, the second largest city in Botswana, with a population of about 100,079 and 150,800 inhabitants for its agglomeration at the 2011 census.

History 
Francistown Senior Secondary School was established in 1978 as a Community Junior Secondary School, in Francistown, Botswana The School had about 15 to 20 staff and was headed by Mr. L.B Gwathe during that time. The total number of student's enrolled in the school rounded up to 480 and classes accommodated 160 each, from form 1 classes to form 3. The School was financially assisted by the World Bank group, through the  Government of Botswana because the school is a government property.

In 2015, the Botswana Examinations Council  rated it as the most improved school in Botswana.

Conversion into Senior Secondary School
In 1987, the school was converted into a Senior Secondary School. The conversion allowed the school to have only two classes which offered pure sciences and arts. The number of student's increased and the staff number also increased from 20 to 60 employees.

See also 

 Education in Botswana

References 

Schools in Botswana
Mixed-sex education
Educational institutions established in 1978
1978 establishments in Botswana